Arkadioi was a former municipality on the island of Zakynthos, Ionian Islands, Greece. Since the 2011 local government reform it is part of the municipality Zakynthos, of which it is a municipal unit. It is located on the north coast of the island. It has a land area of 26.475 km². Its population was 5,215 at the 2011 census. The seat of the municipality was in Vanato (pop. 1,045). Other large towns are Planos (742), Ágios Kírykos (733), Tragáki (622), Kalipado (709), and Sarakinádo (619).

External links
Official website

References

Populated places in Zakynthos